In classical mechanics, Euler's laws of motion are equations of motion which extend Newton's laws of motion for point particle to rigid body motion. They were formulated by Leonhard Euler about 50 years after Isaac Newton formulated his laws.

Overview

Euler's first law
Euler's first law states that the rate of change of linear momentum  of a rigid body is equal to the resultant of all the external forces  acting on the body:

 

Internal forces between the particles that make up a body do not contribute to changing the momentum of the body as there is an equal and opposite force resulting in no net effect.

The linear momentum of a rigid body is the product of the mass of the body and the velocity of its center of mass .

Euler's second law

Euler's second law states that the rate of change of angular momentum  about a point that is fixed in an inertial reference frame (often the center of mass of the body), is equal to the sum of the external moments of force (torques) acting on that body  about that point: 

For rigid bodies translating and rotating in only two dimensions, this can be expressed as:

where:
 is the position vector of the center of mass of the body with respect to the point about which moments are summed,
 is the linear acceleration of the center of mass of the body,
 is the mass of the body,
 is the angular acceleration of the body, and
 is the moment of inertia of the body about its center of mass.

See also Euler's equations (rigid body dynamics).

Explanation and derivation

The distribution of internal forces in a deformable body are not necessarily equal throughout, i.e. the stresses vary from one point to the next. This variation of internal forces throughout the body is governed by Newton's second law of motion of conservation of linear momentum and angular momentum, which for their simplest use are applied to a mass particle but are extended in continuum mechanics to a body of continuously distributed mass. For continuous bodies these laws are called Euler's laws of motion.

The total body force applied to a continuous body with mass , mass density , and volume , is the volume integral integrated over the volume of the body:

Body forces and contact forces acting on the body lead to corresponding moments (torques) of those forces relative to a given point. Thus, the total applied torque  about the origin is given by

where  and  respectively indicate the moments caused by the body and contact forces.

Thus, the sum of all applied forces and torques (with respect to the origin of the coordinate system) acting on the body can be given as the sum of a volume and surface integral:

where  is called the surface traction, integrated over the surface of the body, in turn  denotes a unit vector normal and directed outwards to the surface .

Let the coordinate system  be an inertial frame of reference,  be the position vector of a point particle in the continuous body with respect to the origin of the coordinate system, and  be the velocity vector of that point.

Euler's first axiom or law (law of balance of linear momentum or balance of forces) states that in an inertial frame the time rate of change of linear momentum  of an arbitrary portion of a continuous body is equal to the total applied force  acting on that portion, and it is expressed as

Euler's second axiom or law (law of balance of angular momentum or balance of torques) states that in an inertial frame the time rate of change of angular momentum  of an arbitrary portion of a continuous body is equal to the total applied torque  acting on that portion, and it is expressed as

See also
 List of topics named after Leonhard Euler
 Euler's laws of rigid body rotations
 Newton–Euler equations of motion with 6 components, combining Euler's two laws into one equation.

References

Equations of physics
Scientific observation
Rigid bodies